Dávid Radványi (born 19 September 1989) is a professional Slovak footballer who currently   plays for Vasas SC.

Notes

1989 births
Living people
Sportspeople from Dunajská Streda
Hungarians in Slovakia
Slovak footballers
Association football defenders
FC DAC 1904 Dunajská Streda players
Vasas SC players
Nyíregyháza Spartacus FC players
Veszprém LC footballers
Békéscsaba 1912 Előre footballers
Slovak expatriate footballers
Expatriate footballers in Hungary
Slovak expatriate sportspeople in Hungary